William Osmund Kelly (December 10, 1909 – July 1974) was an American politician who served as mayor of Flint, Michigan.  

He also filled the position of President for Saint Matthew Men's Club, the Flint Bowling Association and the Michigan Chapter of the National Association of Postmasters.

Early life
Kelly was born on December 10, 1909, in Flint. He graduated from Saint Matthew High School in 1928. He then attended Flint Junior College and formed a band, Oz Kelly and his Orchestra, while there. The band played in Cleveland, Ohio, Milwaukee and Flint at the IMA Auditorium. In 1933, he was married to Albina Jayman.

Political life
The Flint City Commission selected him as Mayor on November 12, 1940, and select for another two years.  During World War II, Kelly resigned to join the Navy and served two years in the Pacific.  In 1946, he was the Lieutenant Governor Democratic candidate but lost.  Kelly was appointed in 1949 acting Postmaster—Flint then latter appointed 22nd Postmaster.

Post-political life
In 1956, he became the Flint Manufacturer's Association Executive Director.

References

1909 births
1974 deaths
Mayors of Flint, Michigan
United States Navy personnel of World War II
Military personnel from Michigan
Michigan Democrats
Michigan postmasters
20th-century American politicians